The American Society for Cybernetics (ASC) is an American non-profit scholastic organization for the advancement of cybernetics as a science , a discipline, a meta-discipline and the promotion of cybernetics as basis for an interdisciplinary discourse. The society does this by developing and applying cybernetics’ concepts which are presented and published via its conferences and peer-reviewed publications. As a meta-discipline, it creates bridges between disciplines, philosophies, sciences, and arts. The ASC is a full member of the International Federation for Systems Research (IFSR).

In order to do so it holds conferences and seminars, and maintains contacts with cyberneticians and  organizations for cybernetics in other countries. Further activities of the ASC are:
 ASC Glossary on Cybernetics and Systems Theory
 Disciplinary Matrices in Cybernetics and Systems Science
 Wiener and McCulloch awards

The American Society for Cybernetics was founded in 1964 in Washington, DC to encourage new developments in cybernetics as an interdisciplinary field with Warren McCulloch as first elected president of the ASC. In the 1980s ASC became a member of the International Federation for Systems Research, and in the 1990s supported the Principia Cybernetica Project. 

The ASC has been maintaining an editorial column in the interdisciplinary Cybernetics and Human Knowing Journal since its first issue in 1992. Rodney Donaldson was the first ASC president to write for the column.

Annual Cybernetics Symposia

First Annual Cybernetics Symposium
The First Annual Cybernetics Symposium of the ASC was held on 26-7 October, 1967 at the National Bureau of Standards, Gaithersburg, Maryland. The theme was "Purposive Systems: The Edge of Knowledge." The following people made presentations:
 Saul Amarel: "Problems of representation in artificial intelligence"
 Nikolai Amosov: "Simulation of thinking processes"
 Herbert Anschütz: "Prospects for the development of the psychocybernetics of intelligent behavior"
 Yehoshua Bar-Hillel: "The future of man-machine languages"
 Alexander S. Fraser: "The evolution of purposive behavior"
 Ralph Gerard: "The neurophysiology of purposive behavior"
 Jerrier A. Haddad: "Hardware for purposive systems"
 David Hawkins: "The nature of purpose"
 Margaret Mead: "Cybernetics of Cybernetics"
 Emmanuel G. Mesthene: "How technology will shape the future"
 Talcott Parsons: "Facilitating technological innovation in society"
 Frederick Seitz: "The Challenge"
 Ivan Sutherland: "Facilitating the man-machine interface"

ASC Presidents 

 2021- Paul Pangaro
 2014-2020 Michael Lissack
 2009-2014 Ranulph Glanville
 2005-2008 Louis Kauffman
 2002-2004 Allenna Leonard
 1999-2001 Pille Bunnell
 1994-1998 Frank Galuszka
 1992-1993 Rodney Donaldson
 1989-1991 Fred Steier
 1986-1988 Larry Richards
 1984-1985 Jon Cunnyngham
 1983-1984 Bill Reckmeyer
 1980-1982 Stuart Umpleby
 1978-1979 Barry Clemson
 1976-1977 Mark Ozer
 1975-1976 Herbert Robinson
 1972-1974 Roy Hermann
 1970-1971 Carl Hammer
 1969-1970 Lawrence J. Fogel
 1967-1968 Warren McCulloch

Wiener and McCulloch awards 
The "Wiener Medal in Cybernetics" is an annual award by the American Society for Cybernetics in recognition of outstanding achievements or contributions in the field of cybernetics. Since 2005 the award has been redefined to recognize achievements and contributions from younger scholars and researchers working in cybernetics or with applications of cybernetics. Recipients of the Wiener and McCulloch awards:

 1968: Robert C. Wood
 1968: Warren McCulloch
 1969: Stuart A. Kauffman
 1969: Stephen Grossberg
 1970: Stafford Beer
 1972: Natalia Bechtereva
 1983: Heinz von Foerster
 1984: Gregory Bateson
 1984: Gordon Pask
 1986: Humberto Maturana
 1993: Herbert Brun
 1993: Louis Kauffman
 2001: Klaus Krippendorff
 2005: Ernst von Glasersfeld
 2007: Pille Bunnell
 2007: Charles François
 2007: Laurence Richards
 2007: Stuart Umpleby
 2008: Humberto Maturana
 2008: Francisco Varela
 2008: Ricardo Uribe
 2008: Richard Jung
 2008: Lars Löfgren
 2008: Søren Brier
 2008: Alexander Riegler
 2011: Mary Catherine Bateson
 2011: Robert Vallée
 2011: Thomas Fischer
 2012: Susan Parenti
 2013: Bernard Scott
 2013: Heinz von Foerster Society
 2014: Louis H. Kauffman
 2014: Allenna Leonard
 2014: Paul Pangaro
 2014: Randall Whitaker
 2014: Jennifer Wilby
 2015: Ranulph Glanville
 2016: Julia Frazer and John H. Frazer
 2016: William J. Reckmeyer
 2018: Paul Weston
 2019: Mark Enslin
 2019: Fred Steier

References

External links 
 ASC website
 The ASC Glossary of Cybernetics by the American Society for Cybernetics
 Cybernetics and Human Knowing Journal website
International Federation for Systems Research

Cybernetics
Organizations established in 1964
Systems science societies
George Washington University